The sixth and final season of The L Word started airing on January 18, 2009 and ended its original run on March 8 of the same year. 8 episodes were produced instead of 12.

Episodes

Production
Showtime confirmed a sixth and final season for The L Word. Unlike the show's previous seasons, it only lasted 8 episodes to conclude the show with 71 episodes in total. Studio executives commented on the longevity of the show, with the Showtime president of entertainment Robert Greenblatt saying that The L Word has "surpassed its niche as a gay show". The sixth season premiered on January 18, 2009 and ended its original run on March 8 of the same year. Producers and writers of The L Word took viewers' opinions regarding the final season’s episodes.

Before airing the show, Creator Ilene Chaiken denied reports of socialite Paris Hilton guest starring on an interview on gaydarnation.com. Ilene Chaiken said in an interview with the New York Post Magazine that she had offered DJ Samantha Ronson a guest spot in Season 6 but Ronson declined as she was busy. In July 2008, it was confirmed that Elizabeth Berkley would star as Kelly Wentworth (née Freemont) in a multi-episode arc of the final season.

References

External links

The L Word
2009 American television seasons